"Kura Kura" ("dizziness") is a song recorded by South Korean girl group Twice. It is the group's eighth Japanese maxi single, featuring three other tracks. It was pre-released for digital download and streaming on April 21, 2021, by Warner Music Japan. The single and its B-side, "Strawberry Moon", were physically released on May 12, 2021, in Japan.

Background and release 
Twice announced the song and its B-side, "Strawberry Moon", at the end of their online concert "Twice in Wonderland", which was held on March 6, 2021. Its music video was released on April 20, 2021, on YouTube.

Promotion 

Twice performed "Kura Kura" for the first time at a special showcase to commemorate the single's release, on May 12, 2021, which was broadcast live through YouTube. The group also performed the song on Music Station on May 14.

Track listing

Credits and personnel 
Credits adapted from CD single liner notes.

 Twice – lead vocals, background vocals
 J. Y. Park "The Asiansoul" – lyricist (on "Kura Kura")
 Yu-ki Kokubo – lyricist (on "Kura Kura")
 UTA – composer, arranger, all instruments (on "Kura Kura")
 Sayulee – background vocals
 Red Anne – vocal director (on "Kura Kura")
 Eom Sehee – recording engineer (on "Kura Kura")
 Tony Maserati – mixer (on "Kura Kura")
 Chris Gehringer – mastering engineer (on "Kura Kura")
 Yuka Matsumoto – lyricist (on "Strawberry Moon")
 Trippy – composer, arranger, vocal director, keyboard, electric piano, bass, synthesizer, drum programming (on "Strawberry Moon")
 Ciara – composer (on "Strawberry Moon")
 Perrie – vocal director (on "Strawberry Moon")
 Lee Sangyeop – recording engineer (on "Strawberry Moon")
 Yoon Wonkwon – mixer (on "Strawberry Moon")
 Kwon Namwoo – mastering engineer (on "Strawberry Moon")

Charts

Weekly charts

Year-end charts

Certifications

Release history

References 

2021 singles
2021 songs
Japanese-language songs
Twice (group) songs